Timothée Modibo-Nzockena (January 1, 1950 – March 24, 2016) was a Roman Catholic bishop.

Ordained to the priesthood in 1980, Modibo-Mzockena was appointed bishop in 1997 of the Roman Catholic Diocese of Franceville, Gabon. He served as bishop until his death.

Notes

1950 births
2016 deaths
Gabonese Roman Catholic bishops
Roman Catholic bishops of Franceville
21st-century Gabonese people